Innenheim is a commune in the Bas-Rhin department in Alsace in north-eastern France.

Among speakers of the local language, the village is often called "Enle" or "Inle" according to the speaker's accent.  The suffix "..le" is an Alsatian affectionate diminutive, and equivalent to "..lein" in modern high German.

Geography
The village is positioned between Strasbourg and Obernai.   To the north-west of the commune there is an access junction with the principal north–south autoroute in Alsace, the Autoroute A35.

The economy is based on small traders and agriculture.

Landmarks
The wolf chapel (La chapelle du loup).

See also
 Communes of the Bas-Rhin department

References

Communes of Bas-Rhin
Bas-Rhin communes articles needing translation from French Wikipedia